The Camp of the Fatherland is a political party in the Democratic Republic of Congo. The party won 8 out of 500 seats in the 2006 parliamentary elections. The party's president was Arthur Z'ahidi Ngoma until his death in 2016.

References

Political parties in the Democratic Republic of the Congo